The following lists events that happened during 1912 in South Africa.

Incumbents
 Monarch: King George V.
 Governor-General and High Commissioner for Southern Africa: The Viscount Gladstone.
 Prime Minister: Louis Botha.
 Chief Justice: John de Villiers, 1st Baron de Villiers

Events
January
 1 – The South African Railways implements the reclassification and renumbering of the rolling stock of its three constituent Colonial railways, the Cape Government Railways, the Natal Government Railways and the Central South African Railways.
 4 – The outbreak of smallpox is reported in the Malay Location, Johannesburg.
 8 – The South African Native National Congress (now ANC) is formed in Bloemfontein and John Langalibalele Dube becomes the first president.
 16 – Cases of smallpox are discovered in Durban.

February
 15 – The Mkuze Game Reserve is proclaimed a protected area.

March
 The shield of the coat of arms on the Red Ensign used in South Africa is redesigned to include a white roundel.

July
 1 – The Union Defence Forces, comprising a Permanent Force and a Citizen Force, were established.
 1 – Brig Gen Henry Lukin appointed Inspector-General of the Permanent Force.
 1 – Brig Gen Christian Frederick Beyers appointed Commandant-General of the Citizen Force.

Unknown date

 The town of Hobhouse is established and named after Emily Hobhouse.

Births
 12 March – John Fairbairn, naval officer, (d. 1984)
 18 May – Walter Sisulu, anti-apartheid activist. (d. 2003)

Deaths
 21 May – Julius Wernher, financier and mine magnate. (b. 1850)

Railways

Railway lines opened
 7 February – Free State – Jammerdrif to Wepener, .
 15 April – Transvaal – Buhrmannsdrif to Ottoshoop, .
 1 May – Free State – Firham (Transvaal) to Vrede, .
 20 May – Cape – Wolseley to Ceres, .
 1 August – Cape – Malenge to Franklin, .
 4 November – Transvaal – Zeerust to Ottoshoop, .
 9 November – Transvaal – Newington to Tzaneen, .
 2 December – Cape – Schoombee to Hofmeyr, .
 2 December – Cape – Ottery to Dieprivier, .
 16 December – Cape – Bergrivier to Vredenburg (Narrow gauge), .
 20 December – Cape – Melk to Motkop, .

Locomotives
Five new Cape gauge locomotive types enter service on the South African Railways (SAR):
 January – A single Class ME 2-6-6-2 simple expansion Mallet articulated locomotive.
 Ten Class MC 2-6-6-0 Mallet articulated compound steam locomotives.
 Ten Class 3B 4-8-2 Mountain type steam locomotives that had been ordered by the Natal Government Railways the year before.
 Four "Enlarged Karoo Class" 4-6-2 Pacific type passenger locomotives that had been ordered by the Cape Government Railways in 1911, designated Class 5.
 April – The first eight of forty-six Class 12 4-8-2 Mountain type goods locomotives.

Sports

Rugby
 30 November – The South African Springboks beat Ireland 38–0 in Ireland.

References

South Africa
Years in South Africa
History of South Africa